Lomphat Wildlife Sanctuary is a protected area covering  in eastern Cambodia that was established in 1993. It is heavily forested and straddles Ratanakiri, Mondulkiri, and Kratie provinces. It is home to a variety of endangered wildlife such as banteng, gaur, dholes and sun bear, as well as leopards, Eld's deer, sambar deer, muntjacs and wild pigs. In addition, a number of rare birds are present: surveys have confirmed the presence of green peafowl, greater and lesser adjutant storks, sarus cranes, oriental pied hornbills, giant ibises, white-shouldered ibises, milky and woolly-necked storks, and slender-billed and white-rumped vultures, which are increasingly rare in most of South and Southeast Asia.

A Chinese company is planning to build a dam on the Srepok River, which would flood the surrounding villages and inundate more than a third of the sanctuary.

See also
 Wildlife of Cambodia
 Wildlife of Ratanakiri

References

External links 
 Map of protected areas in Cambodia

Wildlife sanctuaries of Cambodia
Protected areas of Cambodia
Geography of Ratanakiri province
Geography of Mondulkiri province
Geography of Kratié province